The Federal Republic of Germany (FRG) is a Central European country and member of the European Union, G4, G7, the G20, the Organisation for Economic Co-operation and Development and the North Atlantic Treaty Organization (NATO). It maintains a network of 229 diplomatic missions abroad and holds relations with more than 190 countries. As one of the world's leading industrialized countries it is recognized as a major power in European and global affairs.

History

Primary institutions and actors

Federal Cabinet
The three cabinet-level ministries responsible for guiding Germany's foreign policy are the Ministry of Defense, the Ministry of Economic Cooperation and Development and the Federal Foreign Office.  In practice, most German federal departments play some role in shaping foreign policy in the sense that there are few policy areas left that remain outside of international jurisdiction.  The bylaws of the Federal Cabinet (as delineated in Germany's Basic Law), however, assign the Federal Foreign Office a coordinating function.  Accordingly, other ministries may only invite foreign guests or participate in treaty negotiations with the approval of the Federal Foreign Office.

Bundestag
With respect to foreign policy, the Bundestag acts in a supervisory capacity.  Each of its committees – most notably the foreign relations committee – oversees the country's foreign policy.  The consent of the Bundestag (and insofar as Länder are impacted, the Bundesrat) is required to ratify foreign treaties. If a treaty legislation passes first reading, it is referred to the Committee on Foreign Affairs, which is capable of delaying ratification and prejudice decision through its report to the Bundestag.

In 1994, a full EU Committee was also created for the purpose of addressing the large flow of EU-related topics and legislation. Also, the committee has the mandate to speak on behalf of the Bundestag and represent it when deciding an EU policy position. A case in point was the committee's involvement regarding the European Union's eastern enlargement wherein the Committee on Foreign Affairs is responsible for relations with ECE states while the EU Committee is tasked with the negotiations.

NGOs
There is a raft of NGOs in Germany that engage foreign policy issues.  These NGOs include think-tanks (German Council on Foreign Relations), single-issue lobbying organizations (Amnesty International), as well as other organizations that promote stronger bilateral ties between Germany and other countries (Atlantic Bridge).  While the budgets and methods of NGOs are distinct, the overarching goal to persuade decision-makers to the wisdom of their own views is a shared one. In 2004, a new German governance framework, particularly on foreign and security policy areas, emerged where NGOs are integrated into actual policymaking. The idea is that the cooperation between state and civil society groups increases the quality of conflict resolution, development cooperation and humanitarian aid for fragile states. The framework seeks to benefit from the expertise of the NGOs in exchange for these groups to have a chance for influencing foreign policy.

Disputes

In 2001, the discovery that the terrorist cell which carried out the attacks against the United States on 11 September 2001, was based in Hamburg, sent shock waves through the country.

The government of Chancellor Gerhard Schröder backed the following U.S. military actions, sending Bundeswehr troops to Afghanistan to lead a joint NATO program to provide security in the country after the ousting of the Taliban.

Nearly all of the public was strongly against America's 2003 invasion of Iraq, and any deployment of troops. This position was shared by the SPD/Green government, which led to some friction with the United States.

In August 2006, the German government disclosed a botched plot to bomb two German trains. The attack was to occur in July 2006 and involved a 21-year-old Lebanese man, identified only as Youssef Mohammed E. H. Prosecutors said Youssef and another man left suitcases stuffed with crude propane-gas bombs on the trains.

As of February 2007, Germany had about 3,000 NATO-led International Security Assistance Force force in Afghanistan as part of the War on Terrorism, the third largest contingent after the United States (14,000) and the United Kingdom (5,200). German forces are mostly in the more secure north of the country.

However, Germany, along with some other larger European countries (with the exception of the UK and the Netherlands), have been criticised by the UK and Canada for not sharing the burden of the more intensive combat operations in southern Afghanistan.

Global initiatives

Humanitarian aid
Germany is the largest net contributor to the United Nations and has several development agencies working in Africa and the Middle East. The development policy of the Federal Republic of Germany is an independent area of German foreign policy. It is formulated by the Federal Ministry for Economic Cooperation and Development (BMZ) and carried out by the implementing organisations. The German government sees development policy as a joint responsibility of the international community. It is the world's third biggest aid donor after the United States and France. Germany spent 0.37 per cent of its gross domestic product (GDP) on development, which is below the government's target of increasing aid to 0.51 per cent of GDP by 2010. The international target of 0.7% of GNP would have not been reached either.

Ecological involvement

International organizations
Germany is a member of the Council of Europe, European Union, European Space Agency, G4, G8, International Monetary Fund, NATO, OECD, Organization for Security and Co-operation in Europe, UN, World Bank Group and the World Trade Organization.

European Union

European integration has gone a long way since the European Coal and Steel Community (ECSC) and the Elysée Treaty. Peaceful collaborations with its neighbors remain one of Germany's biggest political objectives, and Germany has been on the forefront of most achievements made in European integration:
 Maastricht Treaty

Most of the social issues facing European countries in general: immigration, aging populations, straining social-welfare and pension systems – are all important in Germany.
Germany seeks to maintain peace through the "deepening" of integration among current members of the European Union member states
 European Defence Force
 Introduction of the single currency € Euro

Germany has been the largest net contributor to EU budgets for decades (in absolute terms – given Germany's comparatively large population – not per capita) and seeks to limit the growth of these net payments in the enlarged union.
 European Constitution

NATO

Under the doctrine introduced by the 2003 Defense Policy Guidelines, Germany continues to give priority to the transatlantic partnership with the United States through the North Atlantic Treaty Organization. However, Germany is giving increasing attention to coordinating its policies with the European Union through the Common Foreign and Security Policy.

UN

The German Federal Government began an initiative to obtain a permanent seat in the United Nations Security Council, as part of the Reform of the United Nations. This would require approval of a two-thirds majority of the member states and approval of all five Security Council veto powers.

This aspiration could be successful due to Germany's good relations with the People's Republic of China and the Russian Federation. Germany is a stable and democratic republic and a G7 country which are also favourable attributes. The United Kingdom and France support German ascension to the supreme body. The U.S. is sending mixed signals.

NATO member states, including Germany, decided not to sign the UN treaty on the Prohibition of Nuclear Weapons, a binding agreement for negotiations for the total elimination of nuclear weapons, supported by more than 120 nations.

Bilateral relations 
The information on the establishment of diplomatic relations relates to today's Germany, the Federal Republic of Germany, which was founded in 1949 and since 1990 it is the only German state since the German Reunification on 3 October 1990.

Africa

Americas

Asia

Europe 
 Balkan states

The German government was a strong supporter of the enlargement of NATO.

Germany was one of the first nations to recognize Croatia and Slovenia as independent nations, rejecting the concept of Yugoslavia as the only legitimate political order in the Balkans (unlike other European powers, who first proposed a pro-Belgrade policy). This is why Serb authorities sometimes referred to "new German imperialism" as one of the main reasons for Yugoslavia's collapse. German troops participate in the multinational efforts to bring "peace and stability" to the Balkans.

 Central Europe
Weimar triangle (France, Germany and Poland); Germany continues to be active economically in the states of Central Europe, and to actively support the development of democratic institutions. In the 2000s, Germany has been arguably the centerpiece of the European Union (though the importance of France cannot be overlooked in this connection).

Oceania

Notes

See also

 Anglo-German naval arms race
 Human rights in Germany
 List of diplomatic missions in Germany
 List of diplomatic missions of Germany
 Security issues in Germany
 Sino-German cooperation (1911–1941)
 Visa requirements for German citizens

References

Further reading

German diplomacy
 Bark, Dennis L., and David R. Gress. A History of West Germany. Vol. 1: From Shadow to Substance, 1945–1963. Vol. 2: Democracy and Its Discontents, 1963–1991 (1993), the standard scholarly history
 Blumenau, Bernhard, 'German Foreign Policy and the 'German Problem' During and After the Cold War: Changes and Continuities'. in: B Blumenau, J Hanhimäki & B Zanchetta (eds), New Perspectives on the End of the Cold War: Unexpected Transformations? Ch. 5. London: Routledge, 2018.  .
 Brandenburg, Erich. From Bismarck to the World War: A History of German Foreign Policy 1870-1914 (1927) online.
 Buse, Dieter K., and Juergen C. Doerr, eds. Modern Germany: an encyclopedia of history, people and culture, 1871-1990 (2 vol. Garland, 1998).
 Clark, Claudia. Dear Barack: The Extraordinary Partnership of Barack Obama and Angela Merkel (2021)
 Cole, Alistair. Franco-German Relations (2000)
 Feldman, Lily Gardner. Germany's Foreign Policy of Reconciliation: From Enmity to Amity (Rowman & Littlefield; 2012) 393 pages; on German relations with France, Israel, Poland, and Czechoslovakia/the Czech Republic. excerpt
 Forsberg, Tuomas. "From Ostpolitik to ‘frostpolitik’? Merkel, Putin and German foreign policy towards Russia." International Affairs 92.1 (2016): 21-42. online
 Gaskarth, Jamie, and Kai Oppermann. "Clashing traditions: German foreign policy in a New Era." International Studies Perspectives 22.1 (2021): 84-105. online
 Geiss, Imanuel. German foreign policy, 1871–1914  (1976)
 Haftendorn, Helga. German Foreign Policy Since 1945 (2006), 441pp
 Hanrieder, Wolfram F.  Germany, America, Europe: Forty Years of German Foreign Policy (1991) 
 Heuser, Beatrice. NATO, Britain, France & the FRG: Nuclear Strategies & Forces for Europe, 1949-2000 (1997) 256pp
 Hewitson, Mark. "Germany and France before the First World War: a reassessment of Wilhelmine foreign policy." English Historical Review 115.462 (2000): 570–606. in JSTOR
 Junker, Detlef, ed. The United States and Germany in the Era of the Cold War (2 vol 2004), 150 short essays by scholars covering 1945–1990 excerpt and text search vol 1;  excerpt and text search vol 2
 Kefferputz, Roderick and Jeremy Stern. "The United States, Germany, and World Order: New Priorities for a Changing Alliance." Atlantic Council: Issue Brief (2021) online
 Kimmich, Christoph. German Foreign Policy 1918-1945: A Guide to Research and Research Materials (2nd ed. Scholarly Resources, 1991) 264 pp. 
 Leitz, Christian. Nazi Foreign Policy, 1933-1941: The Road to Global War (2004)
 Maulucci Jr., Thomas W. Adenauer's Foreign Office: West German Diplomacy in the Shadow of the Third Reich (2012) excerpt
 Oppermann, Kai. "National role conceptions, domestic constraints and the new 'normalcy' in German foreign policy: the Eurozone crisis, Libya and beyond." German Politics; 21.4 (2012): 502-519.
 Paterson, William E. "Foreign Policy in the Grand Coalition." German politics 19.3-4 (2010): 497-514.
 Papayoanou, Paul A. "Interdependence, institutions, and the balance of power: Britain, Germany, and World War I." International Security 20.4 (1996): 42–76.
 Schwarz, Hans-Peter. Konrad Adenauer: A German Politician and Statesman in a Period of War, Revolution and Reconstruction (2 vol 1995) excerpt and text search vol 2.
 Schmitt, Bernadotte E. "Triple Alliance and Triple Entente, 1902-1914." American Historical Review 29.3 (1924): 449–473. in JSTOR
Sontag, Raymond James. Germany and England: Background of Conflict, 1848-1898 (1938)
 Spang, Christian W. and Rolf-Harald Wippich, eds. Japanese-German Relations, 1895-1945: War, Diplomacy and Public Opinion (2006)
  Weinberg, Gerhard L. The Foreign Policy of Hitler's Germany (2 vol, 1970–80).
 Wright, Jonathan. Germany and the Origins of the Second World War (Palgrave Macmillan, 2007) 223pp. online review
 Young, William. German Diplomatic Relations 1871-1945: The Wilhelmstrasse and the Formulation of Foreign Policy (2006); how the foreign ministry shaped policy

World/European diplomatic context
 Albrecht-Carrié, René. A Diplomatic History of Europe Since the Congress of Vienna (1958), 736pp; a basic introduction that gives context to Germany's roles
 Kaiser, David E. Economic Diplomacy and the Origins of the Second World War: Germany, Britain, France, and Eastern Europe, 1930-1939 (Princeton UP, 2015).
 Kennedy, Paul. The Rise and Fall of the Great Powers: Economic Change and Military Conflict from 1500 to 2000 (1989)  excerpt and text search; very wide-ranging, with much on economic power
 Langer, William. An Encyclopedia of World History (5th ed. 1973), very detailed outline
 Langer, William.  European Alliances and Alignments 1870-1890 (2nd ed. 1950); advanced coverage of Bismarckian system
 Langer, William L.  The Diplomacy of Imperialism 1890-1902 (2 vol, 1935) 
 Macmillan, Margaret. The War That Ended Peace: The Road to 1914 (2013) cover 1890s to 1914; see esp. ch 3–5, 8, 
 Mowat, R. B. A History of European Diplomacy 1815-1914 (1922), basic introduction
 Schroeder, Paul W. The Transformation of European Politics 1763-1848 (1996) 
 Steiner, Zara. The Lights that Failed: European International History 1919-1933 (2007)  excerpt and text search
 Steiner, Zara. The Triumph of the Dark: European International History 1933-1939 (2011) excerpt and text search
 Taylor, A. J. P. The Struggle for Mastery in Europe: 1848–1918 (1957)  excerpt and text search, advanced coverage of all major powers

External links

 German -Bashing and the Breakup of Yugoslavia, ("The Donald W. Treadgold Papers in Russian, East European and Central Asian Studies, nº 16, March 1998). University of Washington: HMJ School of International Studies
 The German Economy in the New Europe
 EU Enlargement and Transatlantic Relations
 Bierling, Stephan. Die Außenpolitik der Bundesrepublik Deutschland: Normen, Akteure, Entscheidungen. 2. Auflage. München: Oldenbourg, 2005 .
 von Bredow, Wilfried. Die Außenpolitik der Bundesrepublik Deutschland: Eine Einführung. Wiesbaden: VS Verlag für Sozialwissenschaften, 2006 .
 Permanent Mission of Germany to the United Nations
 Auswärtiges Amt
 AICGS American Institute for Contemporary German Studies
 SWP German Institute for International and Security Affairs